Historic Folsom station is a side platformed Sacramento RT Light Rail station in Folsom, California, United States. The station was opened on October 15, 2005, is operated by the Sacramento Regional Transit District and is the current eastern terminus of the Gold Line. The station is located near the intersection of Leidesdorff Street and Folsom Boulevard, adjacent to the Western-themed city center of the old suburb.

Platforms and tracks

References

Sacramento Regional Transit light rail stations
Railway stations in the United States opened in 2005
Folsom, California